C28 or C-28 may refer to:

Vehicles 
 Cessna C-28, an American military transport aircraft
 , a C-class submarine of the Royal Navy
 Sikorsky C-28, an amphibious aircraft bought by the United States Army Air Corps

Other uses 
 C28 road (Namibia)
 Caldwell 28, an open cluster
 Fighting Internet and Wireless Spam Act, an Act of the Parliament of Canada introduced as Bill C-28
 C28 Music, an experimental electronic music artist